The Great Dawn (Georgian: დიადი განთიადი, trans. Diadi Gant’iadi; Russian: Великое зарево, trans. Velikoe Zarevo. English-language title: They Wanted Peace.) is a 1938 Soviet Georgian film directed by Mikheil Chiaureli. It is considered a representation of Joseph Stalin's cult of personality.

Plot
In 1917, the people of the Russian Empire are no longer willing to fight Germany, but the bourgeois government of Alexander Kerensky is unwilling to defy its imperialist allies and stop the war. Only Vladimir Lenin's Bolshevik Party is resolute in calling for peace. In the front, the soldiers of one battalion elect three delegates to travel to St. Petersburg with donations the troops collected for the Pravda newspaper: Gudushauri, Panasiuk and Ershov. The three arrive in the capital and describe the horrendous conditions in which the soldiers live to Joseph Stalin, Lenin's trusted aide and colleague. They join the Bolsheviks and take part in the storming of the Winter Palace, led by Stalin and Lenin. Stalin announces that the great dawn of revolution has broken.

Cast

 as Vladimir Lenin
Mikheil Gelovani as Joseph Stalin
Spartak Bagashvili as Georgi Gudushauri
Tamara Makarova as Svetlana
Nutsa Chkheidze as Gudushauri's mother
Anna Smirnova as Svetlana's mother
Basil Matov as Ershov
Dmitry Ivanov as Panasyuk
Georgi Sagaradze as Tsereteli
Michael Chikhladze as Colonel Mikeladze
Ivan Perestiani as general
Alexander Zhorzholiani as surgeon
Shalva Gambashidze as Karkumidze
Georgi Shavgulidze as Paul Gudushauri
Piotr Morskoi as Deryugin
Boris Poltavtsev as Yakov Sverdlov

Production
The Great Dawn was part of a group of films made in honor of the twentieth anniversary of the October Revolution, which also included Lenin in October and The Vyborg Side; since Sergei Eisenstein's October, it became customary to release pictures about the revolution with each decade anniversary to it. The film was the first in a series of four which director Chiaureli directed with Joseph Stalin as their main theme, and the marked Mikheil Gelovani's first appearance as Stalin on screen - a role he since played in thirteen other productions.

Reception
By April 1939, the picture was already viewed by some 15,000,000 people. In 1941, Chiaureli and Gelovani both won the Stalin Prize, 1st class, for their work on the film.

The Great Dawn was released in the United States in 1940. New York Times' critic interpreted its distribution there as being influenced by the signing of the Ribbentrop-Molotov Pact, writing: "conforming with the pact and the new party line, Soviet filmmakers now tell the world that the Russian and the German comrades would have reconciled back in 1917 if it hadn't been for the Anglo-French "imperialists"... The rest of it is in the familiar vein of Soviet lily-gilding."

Historian Peter Kenez viewed the film as the one "best anticipating the future of Stalin's image" in cinema, noting that Chiaureli allowed him to "escape Lenin's shadow" and turned him to the one the revolutionaries looked up to for leadership. Cinema scholar Nikolas Hülbusch regarded The Great Dawn as "the first contribution of the Tbilisi Studio to Stalin's cult of personality", noting that the premier's character began to exhibit the traits that would define it in later propaganda films, like the ability to mellow out the romantic relationships of his followers. Antonin and Mira Liehm commented that the picture was the first to clearly portray Stalin in the forefront of the Revolution and as Lenin's "closest collaborator and successor". Olga Romanova saw the film as the beginning of a long process, during which Lenin's image in cinema would slowly fade away and allow Stalin to take precedence.

References

External links
They Wanted Peace on the IMDb.
The Great Dawn on kino-teatr.ru.
The Great Dawn on geocinema.ge.

1938 films
1930s biographical drama films
1930s historical drama films
Soviet black-and-white films
Films directed by Mikheil Chiaureli
Russian Revolution films
Soviet-era films from Georgia (country)
Soviet revolutionary propaganda films
Kartuli Pilmi films
Soviet biographical drama films
Soviet historical drama films
Films about Vladimir Lenin
1938 drama films
Black-and-white films from Georgia (country)
Films set in Saint Petersburg
Cultural depictions of Vladimir Lenin
Cultural depictions of Joseph Stalin
1930s Russian-language films